is a Japanese novel series written by Risa and illustrated by .

As of 2010, the original novel series has sold over 300,000 copies in print. It was adapted into a trilogy of live-action films in 2009, and later a stage play in 2010. It was also adapted into a video game in 2011.

Plot

As male demons cannot produce offspring, they choose their mates by turning human girls into demons. One such girl, Kanna Asagiri, is taken to Kigasato High School on her 16th birthday to eventually become the bride of its most powerful demon and student council president, Kaki Kito. In order to protect Kanna, Mitsuaki Shizuma, Minaha Hayasaki, and Reiji Takatsuki assume the roles of her "guardian wings" and court her for her hand in marriage.

Characters

Portrayed by: Rina Aizawa (film), Ai Hazuki (stage play)
Kanna is a 16-year-old girl forced to relocate to Kigasato to be wedded to Kaki. Though bullied throughout her life, she has managed to survive without a guardian wing since birth. By the end of the story she has a son named Tatsuki with Kaki

Portrayed by: Hirofumi Araki (film),  (stage play); 
Kaki is a 93-year-old demon with the appearance of an 18-year-old boy, and he is a student at Kigasato High School.

Portrayed by: Kei Hosogai (film), Hiroki Suzuki (stage play); 
Reiji has the appearance of a 24-year-old man, and he is a nurse at Kigasato High School. His real age is unknown, though he is approximately 400 to 500 years old. He is known as the "beauty of the school infirmary" at school and is described to have beauty that surpasses gender. He serves as one of Kaki's guardian wings.

Portrayed by: Daisuke Watanabe (film),  (stage play); 
Mitsuaki is a 218-year-old demon with the appearance of an 18-year-old boy, and he is a student at Kigasato High School. He serves as one of Kaki's guardian wings.

Portrayed by: Rakuto Tochihara (film),  (stage play); 
Minaha is a 34-year-old demon with the appearance of a 15-year-old boy, and he is a student at Kigasato High School. He is Kanna's classmate and serves as one of Kaki's guardian wings.

Portrayed by: Ryota Murai (film), Ryota Ozawa (2010), Motoki Ochiai (2011) (stage play); 
Hibiki is a 132-year-old demon with the appearance of a 17-year-old boy, and he is a student at Kigasato High School. He plans on killing Kaki and intends on using Kanna to manipulate him.

Portrayed by: Riki Miura (film),  (2010), Kōsuke Kujirai (2011) (stage play); 
Kuniichi is a 221-year-old demon with the appearance of an 18-year-old boy, and he is a student at Kigasato High School. He is one of Kaki's former guardian wings.

Portrayed by: Yukie Kawamura (film); 
Moegi is Reiji's current bride, and they have been married for the past 20 years with no children. She is caring and supportive towards Kanna. In the video game adaptation, she is the bride of Reiji's son, and she has a father-daughter relationship with Reiji instead.
 

Portrayed by: Ai Kago (film),  (stage play); 
Momoko is Kanna's classmate and only friend. She was also originally the bride of a demon, but the demon rejected her in favor of her more attractive sister. Because of this, she resents Kanna for what she perceives as her being pampered and courted by four of the top demons at school. Momoko teams up with Hibiki with the intention of hurting Kanna, but she later learns the error of her ways. She eventually falls in love with Hibiki and they have a son named Kyoya together.

Portrayed by: Yukari Taki (film),  (stage play); 
Shihiko is Kanna's classmate who resents her for capturing Kaki's attention.

Media

Novels

Hana Oni is written by Risa. It was originally serialized on the original fiction website, since 2004. In 2017, Kodansha re-released the series in  format under the Kodansha Bunko imprint.

Spin-off

In addition to the main series, Risa released a spin-off novel titled Hana Oni: Shūen to Hajimari no Otome.

Film

In 2009, Tornado Film produced a trilogy titled . The first film, subtitled , premiered on November 24, 2009 at Odaiba Cinema Mediage. The second film, subtitled , premiered on November 28, 2009 at Marunouchi Toei 2. The third film, subtitled , premiered on December 5, 2009 at Marunouchi Toei 2.

In 2019, AsianCrush licensed the films under the title Battle of Demons in English for non-Asian regions. The second and third films were retitled Battle of Demons 2 and Battle of Demons 3 respectively.

Stage play

A stage play adaptation ran in July 2010, starring then 14-year-old Ai Hazuki. The play had a second run in March 2011, with Hiroki Suzuki, Motoki Ochiai, Kōsuke Kujirai as new cast replacements.

Video game

A video game adaptation titled  was produced by Idea Factory under their Otomate label. , who provided the illustrations to the original novel series, also provided artwork for the game. The game was released on the PlayStation Portable on March 17, 2011 as a visual novel dating simulation. A fan disc sequel titled  was released on March 22, 2012 for the PlayStation Portable. Hana Oni: Yume no Tsuzuki sold 8,023 copes on its first week of release.

An audio drama CD featuring an original story was released on May 18, 2011, with the game's cast reprising their roles. A second drama CD was released on January 18, 2012.

Reception

As of April 2010, over 300,000 physical copies of the book series have been sold.

References

External links
  of the film adaptation 
 Hana Oni: Koi Someru Koku Eikyū no Shirushi

Films based on Japanese novels
Films set in schools
Japanese fantasy films
Japanese fantasy novels
Japanese romance films
Japanese romance novels
Self-published books
Otome games
Plays based on novels
Video games based on novels